Agapostemon splendens, the brown-winged striped-sweat bee, is a species of sweat bee in the family Halictidae.

References

Further reading

External links

 

splendens
Articles created by Qbugbot
Insects described in 1841